Victor Ezeh (born 12 February 2003) is a Nigerian professional basketball player for Kwara Falcons and the Nigeria national team. A graduate of the NBA Academy Africa, he has been considered as one of the top talents in Nigerian basketball.

Early career 
Born in Lagos, Ezeh attended the NBA Academy Africa in Saly, Senegal.

Professional career 
Ezeh was drafted by REG to play in the 2022 season of the Basketball Africa League (BAL) under the BAL Elevate program, however, he was unable to participate as he was at another tournament in Atlanta.

One year later, Ezeh made his professional debut with the Kwara Falcons from his native Nigeria. He was connected with the team with the help of former player Olumide Oyedeji. At the  Louis Edem Basketball Championship, he was named the tournament MVP after leading the Falcons to the championship. Ezeh was the captain of the Falcons during the 2023 BAL season and on 15 March 2023, Ezeh scored a career-high 22 points against the defending BAL champions US Monastir.

National team career 
In February 2023, Ezeh was selected for the Nigeria national men's team for the first time when he joined the team for the 2023 World Cup qualifiers. On 24 February, Ezeh scored 18 points in his D'Tigers debut as he guided Nigeria to a 72–63 win over Ivory Coast, ending their seven-game winning streak.

References 

2003 births
Nigerian men's basketball players
Sportspeople from Lagos
Kwara Falcons players
Shooting guards
Living people